The Air Transport Action Group (ATAG) is a coalition of aviation industry experts focusing on sustainable development issues. Its board of directors is composed of senior representatives from trade associations like Airports Council International, Civil Air Navigation Services Organisation, International Air Transport Association, Airlines for America and Association of Asia Pacific Airlines, plus aircraft manufacturers like Airbus, ATR, Boeing, Bombardier Aerospace, CFM International, Embraer, Honeywell Aerospace, Pratt & Whitney, Rolls-Royce plc and Safran.

External links 
 
 
 
 
 

Organizations established in 1990
Organisations based in Geneva
International air transport
International environmental organizations
International aviation organizations